Candalides is a large genus of butterflies in the family Lycaenidae. The species of this genus are found in the Australasian realm.

Species
Candalides absimilis (C. Felder, 1862)
Candalides acasta (Cox, 1873)
Candalides afretta Parsons, 1986
Candalides ardosiacea (Tite, 1963)
Candalides biaka (Tite, 1963)
Candalides coerulea (Röber, 1886)
Candalides consimilis Waterhouse, 1942
Candalides cuprea (Röber, 1886)
Candalides cyprotus (Olliff, 1886)
Candalides erinus (Fabricius, 1775)
Candalides geminus Edwards & Kerr, 1978
Candalides gilberti Waterhouse, 1903
Candalides grandissima Bethune-Baker, 1908
Candalides heathi (Cox, 1873)
Candalides helenita (Semper, [1879])
Candalides hyacinthina (Semper, [1879])
Candalides lamia (Grose-Smith, 1897)
Candalides limbata (Tite, 1963)
Candalides margarita (Semper, [1879])
Candalides meforensis (Tite, 1963)
Candalides neurapacuna Bethune-Baker, 1908
Candalides parsonsi Tennent, 2005
Candalides pruina Druce, 1904
Candalides riuensis (Tite, 1963)
Candalides silicea (Grose-Smith, 1894)
Candalides tringa (Grose-Smith, 1894)
Candalides viriditincta (Tite, 1963)
Candalides xanthospilos (Hübner, [1817])

External links

"Candalides Hübner, [1819]" at Markku Savela's Lepidoptera and Some Other Life Forms
"Candalides Hübner 1819" species list and images at Tree of Life web project

Candalidini
Lycaenidae genera